Fulaytah ibn Qāsim al-Ḥasanī al-‘Alawī (d. June/July 1133) was the third Emir of Mecca from the sharifian dynasty of the Hawashim. He succeeded his father Qasim after the latter's death in 1123 or 1124. He died in Sha'ban 527 AH (June/July 1133) and was succeeded by his son Hashim.

Sources 

1133 deaths
12th-century Arabs
12th-century births
12th-century deaths
Sharifs of Mecca